The Torneo Ciudad de Montevideo was a Uruguayan football tournament organized by the Uruguayan Football Association in 1973.

The twelve clubs from the Primera División and ten from the Segunda División participated in the tournament, making a total of 22 teams that would face each other between the months of May and July 1973.

List of champions

Titles by club

1973 Torneo Ciudad de Montevideo

Qualified teams
The following teams qualified for the competition.

Final

References

H
Recurring sporting events established in 1973